Sarai, Serai, or Saraj may refer to:

Places
Sarai (city), a large medieval city, and the capital city of the Golden Horde
Saray-Jük, the Little Sarai of the Golden Horde

Azerbaijan
Sarai Village, an old Turkic village in Absheron, Baku
Saray, Qubadli a village in Karabakh, occupied by Armenians
Sarai Masjid, is a mosque of the 15th century, which is included in Shirvanshah's palace complex in Baku, Azerbaijan
Gulustan Palace (Gülüstan Sarai) during the Soviet era is the main state convention center of the Azerbaijani government

Afghanistan
Chaga Serai, (Asadabad) in the Kunar River valley, at the confluence of the Pech River

Eritrea

 Serai, An ancient province in the state of Eritrea

India
Aminagar Sarai, Uttar Pradesh
Bal-Sarai, a village in Amritsar District of Punjab, India
Ber Sarai, Delhi
Begusarai, Bihar
Sarai Khas, a village in Jalandhar District of Punjab, India
Jia Sarai, Delhi
Kheta Sarai, Uttar Pradesh
Laheria Sarai, Darbhanga, Bihar
Mughal Sarai, a popular railway junction in Chandauli district of Uttar Pradesh
Mughal Serai, Punjab
Mughal Serai, Doraha, Punjab
Sarai, Raebareli, a village in Raebareli district, Uttar Pradesh
Sarai Aquil, Uttar Pradesh
Sarai Kale Khan, Delhi
Sarai Mir, Uttar Pradesh
Sarai Rohilla railway station, Delhi
Sarai Shishgaran, Uttar Pradesh
Sulem Sarai, Allahabad, Uttar Pradesh
Nampally Sarai, Andhra Pradesh
Yusuf Sarai, a locality in Delhi

Iran
Sarai Village, East Azerbaijan, Iran
Sarai, East Azerbaijan, Iran
Sarai, Isfahan, Iran
Sarai, Iran, Kermanshah Province, Iran

North Macedonia
Saraj municipality, a municipality in Greater Skopje
Saraj, Skopje, a village near Skopje; seat of the Saraj municipality
Saraj, Bosilovo, a village
Saraj (Resen), a neoclassical estate in Resen built by Ahmed Niyazi Bey

Pakistan
Sarai Alamgir, a town in northern Pakistan
Sarai Alamgir Tehsil, a tehsil in the Gujrat District in Punjab, Pakistan
Serai Naurang, a town in Lakki Marwat District, Khyber Pakhtunkhwa province, Pakistan

Russia
Sarai, Russia, name of several inhabited localities in Russia

Turkey
Saray, Van, also spelled Sarai

People
Sarai, the original name of the biblical Sarah
Sarai (rapper) (born 1981), female rapper
Sarai (tribe), a Jat clan from Punjab, mostly of the Sikh faith
Sarai Givaty (born 1982), an Israeli actress and model

Other
 Sarai (resting place) or caravanserai, a caravan station where travellers would rest
 Sarai, a common name of Shorea robusta, a tree native to the Indian subcontinent
 The Sarai Programme at CSDS  (the Centre for the Study of Developing Societies, an Indian research institute for the social sciences and humanities in Delhi)
 Sarai Records, an independent label founded by Teena Marie

See also
Saray (disambiguation)
Sarah (disambiguation)